Dale Laverne Gentry (July 2, 1917 – June 27, 1968) was an American football end.

Born in Umapine, Oregon, Gentry graduated from Walla Walla High School in Walla Walla, Washington. He played college football at Washington State College in Pullman under head coach Babe Hollingbery, and was selected by the Associated Press as a first-team end on the All-Pacific Coast team in 1941. Gentry also played baseball and basketball for the Cougars.

He served in the U.S. Navy during World War II, and played on the Saint Mary's Pre-Flight Air Devils football team.

Gentry played professional football in the All-America Football Conference for the Los Angeles Dons from 1946 to 1948. He appeared in 42 games, 27 as a starter, and caught 74 passes for 1,001 yards and five touchdowns. He also played professional basketball with the Spokane Blazers of the Pacific Coast Basketball League. Gentry was an assistant at his alma mater under head coach Al Kircher in the 1950s, and later the athletic director at the state penitentiary in Walla Walla.

Gentry died at age fifty in Portland, Oregon, from a heart attack, one day after his teenage son was killed in an automobile accident.

References

1917 births
1968 deaths
American football ends
Los Angeles Dons players
Washington State Cougars football players
Washington State Cougars baseball players
Washington State Cougars men's basketball players
Players of American football from Oregon
Players of American football from Washington (state)
People from Umatilla County, Oregon
Sportspeople from Walla Walla, Washington
United States Navy personnel of World War II
United States Navy officers
Military personnel from Oregon